Andreas Pilavakis (alpine skier) (born 1959), Cypriot alpine skier
Andreas Pilavakis (taekwondo) (born 1960), Cypriot taekwondo athlete